Rolf Gunnarsson (born May 7, 1946) is a Swedish former politician of the Moderate Party. He was a member of the Riksdag from 1994 to 2010.

External links
Riksdagen: Rolf Gunnarsson (m) 

Members of the Riksdag from the Moderate Party
Living people
1946 births
Members of the Riksdag 2002–2006
Place of birth missing (living people)
Members of the Riksdag 1994–1998
Members of the Riksdag 1998–2002
Members of the Riksdag 2006–2010